Elatostematoides is a genus of flowering plants belonging to the family Urticaceae.

Its native range is Malesia to Fiji.

Species:

Elatostematoides australe 
Elatostematoides caudatum 
Elatostematoides falcatum 
Elatostematoides filicoides 
Elatostematoides fruticulosum 
Elatostematoides gracilipes 
Elatostematoides hirtum 
Elatostematoides laxum 
Elatostematoides lonchophyllum 
Elatostematoides machaerophyllum 
Elatostematoides mesargyreum 
Elatostematoides pictum 
Elatostematoides polioneurum 
Elatostematoides rigidum 
Elatostematoides robustum 
Elatostematoides scandens 
Elatostematoides sublaxum 
Elatostematoides vittatum

References

Urticaceae
Urticaceae genera